International Airport is a 1985 American made-for-television drama film starring Gil Gerard and Connie Sellecca. It was directed by Charles S. Dubin and Don Chaffey and executive produced by Aaron Spelling and Douglas S. Cramer.

It was called a "combination of Airport and The Love Boat." It was a pilot for a proposed TV series which did not eventuate; however the film screened as a stand-alone movie. This film marks the final appearance of Susan Oliver in her full-length movies, before her death in 1990.

Plot
A plane is headed toward Hawaii. It is believed a bomb is on board. Fuel is running low and the captain is not sure whether he has enough time to jettison the luggage. Airport manager David Montgomery has to decide whether to call the plane back or let it proceed to Hawaii.

Cast
Gil Gerard as David Montgomery
Connie Sellecca as Dana Fredricks
Berlinda Tolbert as Kathy Henderson
Pat Crowley as Beverly Gerber
Kitty Moffat as Marjorie Lucas
Danny Ponce as Pepe
Cliff Potts as Jack Marshall
Bill Bixby as Harvey Jameson
Susan Blakely as Joanne Roberts
George Grizzard as Martin Harris
George Kennedy as Rudy Van Leuven
Vera Miles as Elaine Corley
Robert Reed as Carl Roberts
Susan Oliver as Mary Van Leuven
Robert Vaughn as Captain Powell

References

External links
International Airport at TCMDB
International Airport at BFI
International Airport at IMDb

1985 television films
1985 films
1985 drama films
ABC network original films
American aviation films
Films set in airports
Television films as pilots
Television pilots not picked up as a series
Films directed by Don Chaffey
Films produced by Aaron Spelling
Films scored by Mark Snow
1980s English-language films
American drama television films
1980s American films